Souk El Haddadine or souk of the smiths is one of the souks of the medina of Tunis.

Location 
It is located in the southern part of the medina, in the Smiths Street.

History 
The souk was founded during the Hafsid era between 1128 and 1535.

Products
It is specialized in producing metal products.

Monuments 
The souk is located near Bab Jedid, one of the medina's famous gates.
Also, Sidi Mahrez Khelloua Mosque, a classified monument is in this souk.

Notes and references 

Haddadine